Claire Victoria Marshall (born 1975) is an English journalist who works for BBC News.

After leaving Chew Valley Comprehensive and then Blundell's School, Devon in 1993, she read for a law degree at Balliol College, Oxford. After graduating from Oxford University, she studied at Cardiff University for a post-graduate diploma in broadcast journalism. Marshall joined ITN as a trainee junior producer on the contract to produce news for Five from its launch. Marshall then joined Sky News as text producer, before producing Sunrise.

Marshall became a freelance reporter and producer in 2000, including working for the BBC in Peru. She then reported for the BBC from Madrid, the Middle East and Mexico. She returned to the UK in 2007 as a News Correspondent, a role in which she reported on a variety of stories that did not need a specialist reporter for BBC Radio, BBC News and BBC One. She soon also became a frequent relief presenter on the BBC News channel and also BBC World News, and stood in on BBC Breakfast at the weekend. In 2008 she returned to South America as a correspondent, giving up her presenting role. Marshall returned to the UK when she was appointed the BBC's Midlands Correspondent, working for network news and regularly appearing on the BBC Six and Ten O'Clock News, and the West Midland regional news Midlands Today.

In 2013 she was made Environment Correspondent for the BBC.

She appeared as herself, doing a mocked up Newsnight report on the 2007 BBC Two drama series Party Animals.

References

External links

Famous Old Blundellians
Blundell’s Foundation Newsletter October 2003

1975 births
Living people
Alumni of Balliol College, Oxford
Alumni of Cardiff University
BBC newsreaders and journalists
BBC World News
English journalists
ITN newsreaders and journalists
People educated at Blundell's School
English reporters and correspondents
Sky News newsreaders and journalists
People educated at Chew Valley School